Return from Hell is a 1983 Romanian drama film directed by Nicolae Mărgineanu. It was entered into the 13th Moscow International Film Festival where it won a Special Diploma. The film was also selected as the Romanian entry for the Best Foreign Language Film at the 56th Academy Awards, but was not accepted as a nominee.

Cast
 Constantin Brînzea (as Constantin Branzea)
 Maria Ploae
 Remus Margineanu
 Ana Ciontea as Catarina
 Ion Sasaran
 Vasile Nitulescu
 Lucia Mara
 Liliana Ticau
 Livia Baba
 Olimpia Arghir

See also
 List of submissions to the 56th Academy Awards for Best Foreign Language Film
 List of Romanian submissions for the Academy Award for Best Foreign Language Film

References

External links
 

1983 films
1983 drama films
Romanian drama films
1980s Romanian-language films
Romanian World War I films